The Children of Armenia Fund (COAF) (Armenian: «Հայաստանի Մանուկներ» բարեգործական հիմնադրամ (ՔՈԱՖ)) is a non-profit organization dedicated to advancing educational opportunities and building infrastructure for children and families across rural Armenia. As of 2022, the organization has raised $54,621,582 and brought resources to 107,239+ people across 63 rural communities.

History
Founded in 2004 by American-Armenian scientist and philanthropist Dr. Garo H. Armen, COAF’s efforts began in one village in the Armavir region and have since expanded into 63 communities across 5 regions. Originally established to provide the infrastructure needed to address issues such as a lack of clean water, COAF quickly recognized the need for a community-driven approach and today focuses on delivering high-impact, long-lasting, and sustainable initiatives, such as formal and non-formal education, teacher training, and accessible medical care.

Activity 
COAF’s mission is to provide the necessary resources for all the children of Armenia to achieve their full potential. By empowering rural children and their families, COAF's initiatives seek to advance formally overlooked communities by tapping into the residents’ passion and innovation.

By utilizing a holistic approach to development, COAF implements self-sustaining initiatives, such as early-childhood education, internships for students, career training for graduates, and phycological support for families and veterans. COAF's projects range from teaching schoolchildren good hygiene practices, to helping rural entrepreneurs launch small businesses.

Supporters
COAF has partnered with the Armenian government, the British Council, the EU, the UNDP, the World Bank, and embassies from across the world.

COAF’s supports include Jennifer Aniston, Cher, Leonardo DiCaprio, Ariana Grande, Tom Hanks, Chris Rock, and a variety of Armenian celebrities.

Transparency 
COAF is an accredited 501(c)(3) organization, and has received a 95.53/100, 4/4-Star rating from Charity Navigator, alongside GuideStar’s Platinum Seal of Transparency.

References

External links
Children of Armenia Fund, official website

Philanthropic organizations based in the United States
Non-profit organizations based in New York City
Philanthropic organizations based in Armenia
Rural community development
After school programs
Democratic education
Foreign charities operating in Armenia